Vaijapur Assembly constituency is one of the six constituencies of the Maharashtra Vidhan Sabha located in the Aurangabad district.

It is a part of the Aurangabad (Lok Sabha constituency) along with five other assembly constituencies, viz Kannad Assembly constituency, Gangapur, Maharashtra Assembly constituency, Aurangabad East Assembly constituency, Aurangabad Central Assembly constituency and Aurangabad West Assembly constituency

Members of Legislative Assembly
 1985: Ramkrishna Baba Patil, Indian National Congress
 1990: Ramkrishna Baba Patil, Indian National Congress
 1995: Kailash Ramrao Patil, Indian National Congress
 1999: Rangnath Muralidar Wani, Shiv Sena
 2004: Rangnath Muralidar Wani, Shiv Sena
 2009: Rangnath Muralidar Wani, Shiv Sena
 2014: Bhausaheb Patil Chikatgaonkar, Nationalist Congress Party
 2019: Ramesh Nanasaheb Bornare Patil , Shiv sena

Election results

Assembly Elections 2004

Assembly Elections 2009

Assembly Elections 2014

See also
Vaijapur

References 

Assembly constituencies of Maharashtra
Year of establishment missing
Aurangabad district, Maharashtra